William Webster (1880 —10 March 1931) was an English cricketer who played for Derbyshire in 1911.

Webster made a single first-class appearance for the side in May 1911 against Yorkshire. Batting from the lower order, Webster scored three runs in the first innings and a duck in the second, being bowled out both times.

Webster died at Dinnington, Yorkshire at the age of 50.

External links
William Webster at Cricket Archive 

1880 births
1931 deaths
English cricketers
Derbyshire cricketers